The House of Calich was a Ragusan noble family. They were first mentioned in the period of 1279–1317. In 1377, a "Dobre de Calich" is mentioned. In the beginning of the 15th century Ragusan nobility were present in Novo Brdo as merchants or mining lords; Calich were also present. In 1457 a "Calice" is mentioned in Novo Brdo. They were among the eleven smallest houses in the 15th century.

Annotations

References

Sources

Ragusan noble families